Katya Galstyan  (born January 1, 1993) is a cross-country skier competing for Armenia. She competed for Armenia at the 2014 Winter Olympics in the 10 kilometre classical race, finishing in 64th place out of 76 competitors. She was the only woman to represent her country at the 2014 Winter Olympics and 2018 Winter Olympics.

In January 2022, Galstyan was named to Armenia's 2022 Olympic team.

See also
Armenia at the 2014 Winter Olympics
Armenia at the 2018 Winter Olympics

References

1993 births
Living people
Cross-country skiers at the 2014 Winter Olympics
Cross-country skiers at the 2018 Winter Olympics
Cross-country skiers at the 2022 Winter Olympics
Armenian female cross-country skiers
Olympic cross-country skiers of Armenia